For all tid ("For All Time") is the debut studio album by Norwegian black metal band Dimmu Borgir. It was released in 1995 through No Colours. It was remastered and re-released in 1997 through their new label Nuclear Blast with the front cover art in full color and the entire Inn i evighetens mørke EP added. It is the band's only studio album on which Shagrath is on drums, Tjodalv on guitar and Silenoz on vocals.

The artwork displayed on the front cover of the album is inspired by Gustave Doré's illustration of Camelot from Idylls of the King.

Track listing

Critical reception 

In their favourable review of the album, AllMusic wrote, "The production is awful, boasting thin and sharp guitars, muted drumming and echoing vocals that sound like what it might have been like to stand outside of their rehearsal hall. But somehow the songs manage to overcome the production, offering a somewhat beautiful (albeit warped) view of heavy metal that comes off far more ambitious than a band in their position usually does."

Personnel 

 Dimmu Borgir

 Silenoz – lead vocals and rhythm guitar
 Tjodalv – lead guitar
 Stian Aarstad – synthesizers, keyboards and effects
 Brynjard Tristan – bass guitar
 Shagrath – drums, backing vocals and third guitar on "Glittertind"

 Additional personnel

 Vicotnik (Dødheimsgard, Ved Buens Ende, Code, Naer Mataron) – backing vocals
 Aldrahn (Dødheimsgard, Thorns, Zyklon-B) – backing vocals and lead vocals (on "Over bleknede blåner til dommedag")

 Production

 Dimmu Borgir – arrangement and production
 Bård Norheim – recording and engineering
 Christophe Szpajdel – logo

References 

1995 debut albums
Dimmu Borgir albums
Norwegian-language albums